Sattam Fendi Abbas Al Fayez (Arabic: سطام الفايز , ( – 1891) was an emir who led the Bani Sakher tribe from 1881 until his death in 1891. He was the de facto ruler of the Bani Sakher after his father Fendi Al-Fayez gave him most of his responsibilities in the late 1870s, and was the first person to have led Westerners to view the Moab Stone in 1870. Sattam was also the first tribal sheikh to begin cultivating land in the 1860s, which began the sedentary settlement process of many of the biggest tribes in Jordan. In September 1881, after the reunification of the Al-Fayez family under Sattam, he was recognized by the Ottoman Administration as the Emir of Al-Jizah and the paramount Shaykh of the Bani Sakher clan.

Kerak Castle 
In his 1881 trip to the land of Palestine, Henry B. Tristram was imprisoned in the Kerak Castle by the Sheikh of the Majalis. Sattam, who was expecting Henry's arrival, was notified of this, and decided to ride to Al-Kerak to free Henry, whom he had become friends with 13 years prior. Sattam appeared with only two other men, and he demanded that the Majalis hand over Henry and his crewmates, with the Majalis asking for ransom in return. According to Henry, Sattam replied to the Majalis calmly:

Henry and his crewmates were released the same day, and set off the next morning.

See also 

 Fendi Al-Fayez
 Mithqal Al-Fayez
 Akef Al-Fayez
 Faisal Al Fayez
 Al-Fayez

References 

Emirs
Sattam
Jordanian political people
1830 births
1891 deaths
Year of birth uncertain
Warriors
Tribal chiefs
Lords
Bedouins
Arab politicians
Arabs